Renato Gašpar (born 29 July 1977) is a Croatian alpine skier. He competed in two events at the 1998 Winter Olympics.

References

1977 births
Living people
Croatian male alpine skiers
Olympic alpine skiers of Croatia
Alpine skiers at the 1998 Winter Olympics
Sportspeople from Zagreb
20th-century Croatian people